Stadion Šubićevac, also known simply as Šubićevac, is an association football stadium in Šibenik, Croatia. It is the home stadium of HNK Šibenik football club. The stadium has a capacity of 3,412, all of which is seated.

The stadium was in the Communist era named after the leader of Yugoslav Partisans Rade Končar and known as Stadion Rade Končar. Last time it was renovated in the summer of 2020.

History
Construction of a new stadium began in early 1946, as part of the sports complex which featured a football pitch, athletics track, courts for tennis, basketball and volleyball and concrete stands. The location chosen for the project was an area called Šubićevac, which is where Rade Končar, a notable Second World War anti-fascist fighter, was executed by the Italian army along with 25 other members of the resistance. The stadium was hence named Stadion Rade Končar in memory of him.

The first phase of the construction went on for two years, and the stadium broke ground on 1 May 1948, when a friendly match was played between Šibenik and Hajduk Split. Several football games as part of the 1979 Mediterranean Games, hosted by nearby Split, were also played on the stadium.

The final of the 2019–20 Croatian Cup between Rijeka and Lokomotiva was played on the stadium on 1 August 2020.

International matches

References

External links
Stadion Šubićevac at the HNK Šibenik official website 

HNK Šibenik
Šubićevac
Sport in Šibenik
Sports venues completed in 1948
Buildings and structures in Šibenik-Knin County
Sport in Šibenik-Knin County